Cecil J. Toor (July 28, 1895 – May 23, 1969) was an American football coach. He served as the head football coach at Delaware Valley College in 1922.

References

External links
 

1895 births
1969 deaths
Delaware Valley Aggies football coaches
Sportspeople from Philadelphia
Players of American football from Philadelphia